Rhyzodiastes janus is a species of ground beetle in the subfamily Rhysodinae. It was described by R.T. & J.R. Bell in 1985. It is endemic to Fiji. Rhyzodiastes janus measure  in length.

References

Rhyzodiastes
Beetles of Oceania
Insects of Fiji
Endemic fauna of Fiji
Beetles described in 1985